Scalloping may refer to:

Activities related to the sea creature
Scallop fishing 
Scallop gathering

Other uses
Scalloping (fingerboard), shaping of fingerboards of stringed instruments
Scalloping, gratin preparation, a casserole cooking technique
Radar scalloping, a radar phenomenon that reduces sensitivity for certain distance and velocity combinations
An arrangement of plates in a steel dam, to allow expansion and contraction

See also
 Scaloppine or scaloppini, an Italian dish